NGC 2835 is an intermediate spiral galaxy located in the constellation Hydra. It is located at a distance of circa 35 million light years from Earth, which, given its apparent dimensions, means that NGC 2835 is about 65,000 light years across. It was discovered by Wilhelm Tempel on April 13, 1884. NGC 2835 is located only 18.5 degrees from the galactic plane.

NGC 2835 is seen nearly face-on. The galaxy features four or five spiral arms, visible in near infrared due to their population II stars. The spiral arms have also numerous HII regions and stellar associations, the larger of which are 5 arcseconds across. Although the galaxy is quite symmetric, the northern arms have HII regions that appear brighter than the southern ones. Also the southern arms appear less developed in their outer parts than the north ones. In the centre of NGC 2835 lies a supermassive black hole whose mass is estimated to be 3-10 million (106.72±0.3) , based on the spiral arm pitch angle.

NGC 2835 is the foremost galaxy in a small group of galaxies, the NGC 2835 group. Other galaxies identified as members of the cluster are ESO 497-035, and ESO 565-001. A bit farther away, at projected separation of 2.2 degrees, lies NGC 2784 and its small galaxy group.

See also 
 NGC 5068 - another low mass spiral galaxy

References

External links 

Intermediate spiral galaxies
Hydra (constellation)
2835
UGCA objects
26259
Astronomical objects discovered in 1884
Discoveries by Wilhelm Tempel